The 2014–15 Vermont Catamounts men's basketball team represented the University of Vermont during the 2014–15 NCAA Division I men's basketball season. The Catamounts, led by fourth year head coach John Becker, played their home games at Patrick Gym and were members of the America East Conference. They finished the season 20–14, 12–4 in America East play to finish in a tie for second place. They advanced to the semifinals of the America East tournament where they lost to Stony Brook. They were invited to the  College Basketball Invitational where they defeated Hofstra in the first round and Radford in the quarterfinals before losing in the semifinals to Louisiana–Monroe.

Roster

Schedule

|-
!colspan=9 style="background:#008000; color:#FFD700;"| Exhibition

|-
!colspan=9 style="background:#008000; color:#FFD700;"| Regular season

|-
!colspan=9 style="background:#008000; color:#FFD700;"| America East tournament

|-
!colspan=9 style="background:#008000; color:#FFD700;"| College Basketball Invitational

References

Vermont Catamounts men's basketball seasons
Vermont
Vermont
Cat
Cat